"Small Sacrifices" is the eighth episode of the seventh season of the American medical drama House. It aired on November 22, 2010.

Plot
A patient is admitted to Princeton Plainsboro after reenacting the Crucifixion. During the initial conversation, the patient reveals that he crucified himself to honor a bargain he made with God for curing his daughter's cancer. Taub comes up with a sound diagnosis but the patient starts losing teeth so the team scraps the idea. However, Chase and Masters break into the patient's apartment to see that he has been starving himself which was the likely cause of the tooth loss. Regardless, the patient refuses the treatment because of the promise he made to God to save his daughter.

Meanwhile, Cuddy walls House for an apology about lying to her and also pulls him for the wedding dinner of the hospital's chairman-of-board. Chase takes Foreman to the wedding as a wingman and fixes him up with a girl, telling her that Foreman's his boss. At the end of the night, Chase takes off with that very girl and a friend of hers. While House and Cuddy start leaving for the rehearsal dinner, Cuddy makes a cynical remark by telling him that the marrying couple has only nineteen months because, in the state of New Jersey, couples can only divorce after 18 months of living separated, implying they would split-up after their honeymoon. House and Cuddy discuss Cuddy's wedding gown of preference and House says that it wouldn't be Cuddy's first marriage if she married. She says that it would, but deducing from her remark about New Jersey divorce laws, House says that he had checked the records stating that she was married for six days in 1987 and that she lied to him, but he forgives her. Cuddy storms off.

Taub notices his wife take her cellphone to the bathroom that morning and suspects that she's having an affair. Confronting her about it, he learns that she's been corresponding with somebody from an infidelity support group. At the wedding dinner, Taub and Rachel have an argument about her friend. Rachel stands her ground, implying taking revenge on Taub's adulterous past.

After the dinner, during a conversation with Taub, Foreman, and Wilson, House gets an idea and runs back to the hospital. He visits the patient and tells him that the annual CT scans that his daughter receives were unable to detect tiny spots of remaining tumor and the PET scans he did revealed them. He concludes that the patient should receive the treatment because God had already broken the bargain. Embittered, the patient agrees. Later on, House reveals that he had been lying, but that the patient is recovering. Instead of losing his faith, he thinks that the proof that, even after accepting stem cell treatment, God did not punish him proves that God is merciful and all about love, as his daughter said.

Meanwhile, Wilson tells House that Sam asked him to review her medical files in order for things to run smooth for a management change. House checks them in Wilson's absence and remarks that Sam had five files which point towards a misconduct about medicine doses. Wilson struggles for a cover but House reassures him that Sam must have done so because the patients were most likely terminal and overdosing would serve as some sort of relief, adding that Sam and Wilson were a perfect match. Wilson reveals that he's going to propose during the wedding. Wilson proposes to Sam by telling her how impressed he is about her moral sense about those five cases. Sam is afraid of commitment and gets cold feet. She covers it up by accusing Wilson that she was honest when she said she did not interfere and blames Wilson for not trusting her. Wilson comes home to see Sam packing up ready to flee. After a volatile argument about confidence, Sam dumps Wilson and runs away.

At the end of the episode, House apologizes to Cuddy and asks for a leap of faith, promising never to lie to her again. That night, Wilson comes over to House's apartment. House tells him that he apologized to Cuddy but in fact he was lying again.

Music
"Shark in the Water" by V V Brown
"I Know" by Jude
"You Mean the World to Me" by Toni Braxton
"Love Rollercoaster" by The Ohio Players

Reception

Critical response   
The A.V. Club gave this episode a B− rating.

IGN gave the episode 6.5 out of 10.

References

External links
 

House (season 7) episodes
2010 American television episodes
Television episodes about weddings